Speechley is a surname. Notable people with the surname include:

Anne Elizabeth Speechley (1903–1992), Australian politician
Jim Speechley, former Conservative Party councillor and leader of the Lincolnshire County Council
Michael Speechley (born 1964), Australian former professional rugby league footballer
William Speechley (1906–1982), British ice hockey player who competed in the 1928 Winter Olympics

See also
Schley (disambiguation)
Speech